The FIL European Luge Championships 1990 took place in Igls, Austria for a second time after hosting the event previously in 1951.

Men's singles

Women's singles

Men's doubles

Mixed team

Medal table

References
Men's doubles European champions
Men's singles European champions
Mixed teams European champions
Women's singles European champions

FIL European Luge Championships
1990 in luge
Luge in Austria
1990 in Austrian sport